Aşağı Qılıçbağ is a village de jure in the Khojaly District of Azerbaijan, but de facto in the Askeran Province of the self-proclaimed Republic of Artsakh.

References 

Populated places in Khojaly District